Juan Pablo Adame Alemán (born 12 September 1985) is a Mexican politician affiliated with the PAN.  He served as Deputy of the LXII Legislature of the Mexican Congress representing Morelos.

See also
 List of people from Morelos, Mexico

References

1985 births
Living people
People from Cuernavaca
Members of the Chamber of Deputies (Mexico) for Morelos
National Action Party (Mexico) politicians
21st-century Mexican politicians
Monterrey Institute of Technology and Higher Education alumni
Politicians from Morelos
Deputies of the LXII Legislature of Mexico